The Berlin Radio Symphony Orchestra (Rundfunk-Sinfonieorchester Berlin) was founded in 1923 and situated in East Berlin during the Cold War.

Berlin Radio Symphony Orchestra may also refer to:
 The Deutsches Symphonie-Orchester Berlin, known from 1956 to 1993 as the Radio-Symphonie-Orchester Berlin and situated in West Berlin during the Cold War